Love or Loved Part.1 is the first EP by South Korean rapper, singer-songwriter and record producer B.I, released by 131 and Transparent Arts on November 18, 2022. This EP is the first half of B.I's global album project Love or Loved [L.O.L], and consists of five tracks, including the single "BTBT", previously released on May 13, 2022 by IOK and Transparent Arts, and the lead single "Keep Me Up".

For Love or Loved Part.1, B.I collaborated with The Stereotypes and other U.S-based producers, who created the beats and melodies of three of the five songs. B.I co-composed the two remaining tracks and wrote or co-wrote the lyrics of all the songs.

B.I's global album project Love or Loved is an exploration into love –  "the start of love, the breaking up of love, all the stages of love." The singer-songwriter developed this theme in his music videos through "a futuristic concept focused on the youth living in it, their love stories and rebellious moments." He chose to split the album into two parts so that each EP would convey a clear message. The first part, Love or Loved Part.1, represents the "love" side of the project. B.I described it as "powerful, loving, sweet." Meanwhile, the second part, the "loved" side, will talk about "heartbreak, loneliness and emptiness," as he felt that the opposite of love was neither "I don't like you" nor "I don't love you anymore", but rather "I loved you before," "the absence of love."

Background
In February 2022, B.I's talent agency in the U.S, Wasserman Music, hinted B.I's upcoming single and global EP on their website. Then, in April 2022, B.I confirmed in an interview that he would be releasing a single soon followed by an EP. While talking about the upcoming single, B.I added, "I wrapped up filming my music video. There are some super shocking scenes that we worked on. All I can tell you is that I literally almost fainted shooting some of these scenes." Shortly after, at midnight KST on April 20, 2022, B.I's label, 131, announced his 2022 global album project. The YouTube video associated with the announcement showed that the project included a pre-release single and two EPs. On May 1, 2022, the first pre-release single under the project was announced to be released on May 13th, 2022. On May 4, 2022, it was revealed to be "BTBT", a collaboration with American rapper and record producer Soulja Boy, and featuring South Korean hip-hop soloist DeVita.

B.I explained later on that he wanted to work with DeVita on "BTBT" because he thought her voice was well suited to the song. Soulja Boy's name was mentioned when B.I and his team were brainstorming about possible collaborators. He decided to ask the American rapper because he had liked his music ever since he was young.

On September 25, 2022, a few months after the release of "BTBT", 131 published a poster stating that the first EP under the global album project, titled Love or Loved Part.1, was to be released soon in November. The exact date, November 18, 2022, was announced on October 3, 2022.

"BTBT" was jointly published by IOK and Transparent Arts, as 131 was affiliated with IOK Music at the time. When Love or Loved Part.1 came out, B.I had already resigned from his executive director position in IOK, and 131 had become an independent label. Therefore the EP was released under 131 and Transparent Arts instead.

Production
The first three tracks of Love or Loved Part.1 – "BTBT", "Keep Me Up" and "Middle With You" – contain English verses and were co-written by B.I along with lyricists from the U.S. After the release of "BTBT", B.I explained that he was currently studying English because he wanted to write songs entirely in English by himself in the future.

Through his global album project, B.I also intended to challenge himself by working with different producers and "take on new styles of music". The renowned U.S-based production team The Stereotypes, whom he had already collaborated with for the single "Got It Like That", composed "BTBT" and "Keep Me Up" along with 9am. Nick Lee and Jake Herring composed "Middle With You". For B.I, this was an opportunity to learn from "their styles and processes of making music." He also revealed he had developed a new way to use his voice for this EP, changing his tone, pronunciation and accent. In contrast to his previous albums, Love or Loved Part.1 showcases B.I's singing more than his rapping. "While I'm a rapper, I'm also a producer, dancer and singer", he said. "With every single album, one particular side may stand out more".

The lyrics of the last two tracks – "Tangerine" and "Endless Summer" – are in Korean except for a few lines. They were written by B.I and co-composed with producers who had already arranged some of his songs in the past.

Lyrics and music
B.I compared the five songs of Love or Loved Part.1 to stories. Each of them tells different aspects of youthful love, whether "situations being in love can put you in" or "emotions [...] associated with the world of love." Overall, they show love as "something that we devote ourselves to despite the fact that we know that it has an end." B.I stated that the message is "let's fall in love and completely dive into feelings we may grow to be cautious of as we get older."

The opening song of the EP is the pre-release single "BTBT" – pronounced like an English acronym as the track's name, while it's sung "비틀비틀" (biteul biteul) in the chorus. The word "BTBT" was derived from the Korean verb "비틀거리다" (biteulgeolida), which means "to stagger", alluding to a metaphorical drunkenness caused by love. According to B.I, the song talks about the "passionate feelings you get when you meet somebody or start a relationship" and, more generally, about the "powerful and rebellious kind of love we experience in our adolescence."

"Keep Me Up", the second song and title track of the EP, is "about fierce love, but at the same time embodies the loneliness of the person who sings. Like wandering around looking for love to fill an empty heart." B.I also explained that "Keep Me Up" depicts "an instinctual desire and thirst that we all have."

B.I described the third song, "Middle With You", as a "cute and fresh" declaration of love, reminiscent of the color pink.
Yet he also called it a "more mature" song than "Keep Me Up", expressing an older narrator's wish to escape from everything through an innocent love.

The fourth song, "Tangerine", was inspired by the movie Eternal Sunshine of the Spotless Mind. The song talks about choosing to love despite knowing that a relationship is likely to fail. It was named after a line from the movie, when the female protagonist, Clementine, dyes her hair orange and the main male character, Joel, calls her "Tangerine." The line "Okay, okay, okay, okay, okay" in the second verse is also a quote, from the single word "OK." said by Joel in the last scene of the film, after a fight with Clementine.

For the fifth and last track, "Endless Summer", B.I drew inspiration from another movie, Eternal Summer, which he remembered as "blue, like a bruise" with "a damp scent, like a damp summer beach and the smell of the ocean." The song was also inspired by a poem which, according to him, "is about not counting the age with days that go by, but only the summers that one spends with their loved one, because those are the only days the person has been truly themselves."

Musically, Love or Loved Part.1 brings together a variety of genres and sounds to tell its stories. "Keep Me Up" was introduced as a latin pop track. Commentators heard EDM and tropical influences in "Endless Summer". "Middle With You" was said to be pop music, and "BTBT" was described by music writers as a R&B song with a "latin-inspired progression" and Afrobeats drums.

Artwork and packaging
B.I and 131's creative team thought up two distinctive types of packaging for the EP. Aside from the CD, the main component of the Real Pack version is a life-size photograph of the singer-songwriter. As for the Card Pack version, it contains an actual deck of French-suited playing cards, building on a gaming concept that was also described by B.I as a "key aspect of the story" for the music videos of "BTBT" and "Keep Me Up". Additionally, the playing cards convey the idea of love through photographs of B.I and love-related symbols, notably the recurring image of a rose, generally black and at times burning. In some pictures, the artist himself embodies the flower.

Release and promotion
A futuristic music video for "BTBT" was released on May 13, 2022, at midnight KST, prior to the release of the single. The music video presented an alternative version of the single that excluded the verse from Soulja Boy, and only included DeVita's featuring. The single was then released on digital music and streaming platforms on May 13, 2022, at 1 PM KST. A dance performance film, in collaboration with and choreographed by South Korean dance crew Aitty Too (82) was released on May 18, 2022, at midnight KST.

The EP Love or Loved Part.1 was released on digital music platforms on November 18, 2022, at 2 PM KST (midnight EDT). A music video for the title track "Keep Me Up" came out concurrently, showcasing a choreography by Aitty Too members Youngbeen, Shawn and Beom.

As a part of the global project promotion, 131 introduced "B.I 2022 Global Album Project Documentary" on May 3, 2022, at midnight KST, with a teaser titled But hard work alone isn't enough of a reason for praise. The documentary for "BTBT", I'll master the unknown and prove it to you, with B.I confessing about his despairs and dreams, was released at midnight KST on May 22, 2022.

On November 23, 2022, 131 announced the upcoming release of various contents related to Love or Loved Part.1, including live clips for each track, a dance practice video for the title track, "Keep Me Up", and a documentary film for Love or Loved Part.1. The latter was released in two parts. The first part, That one cannot exist without the other, came out on B.I's YouTube channel at midnight KST on December 2, 2022, the second part, Don't ever give up on love above all else, on December 8, 2022, at 6 PM KST.

B.I performed "BTBT" in public for the first time during the BTBT Guerrilla Showcase he held in Seoul on May 28, 2022. On June 26, 2022, he sang "BTBT" and unveiled the yet unreleased tracks "Tangerine" and "Endless Summer" during his online event BTBT Performance Online Fancon. He also promoted "BTBT" through Arirang TV's music program Simply K-Pop Con-Tour in June and July 2022 (episodes 524 to 527), then performed the song in fan meetings and festivals in South Korea and across Southeast Asia from July to September 2022. Following the release of the EP, he held his first offline concert since his debut as a soloist, All Day Show [L.O.L: The Hidden Stage], in Seoul on December 10, 2022. In March 2023, he embarked on the L.O.L: The Hidden Stage tour, with six stops in Southeast and East Asia.

In connection with his global album project, B.I collaborated with Ojeito and Arena Embroidery on a series of limited edition bags, titled "the pieces of love". Four "chapters" became successively available on August 31, September 9, September 23 and November 16, 2022.

Critical reception 
MTV News included the pre-release single "BTBT" in its "Bop Shop" selection for the week of May 13, 2022. While describing the song as "intense and inspired," "a unique recount of an experience with love at first sight," the publication stated that "B.I displays a deep sense of confidence and security with this comeback, combining his distinctive raspy vocals with a layered, bass-heavy track to create a genre completely his own."

In contrast, IZM writer Son Ki-ho found the song "monotonous" and rated it 1.5 out of 5 stars.

Accolades 
"BTBT" was mentioned as one of the best K-pop songs of 2022 by numerous magazines. It was one of the ten songs Nylon included in its list of "The 20 Best K-pop releases of 2022", describing the song as an "hypnotic track." NME named it as the second best K-pop song of the year, explaining that "This sensuous R&B song, underlined by prominent bass and the syncopations of percussion, allows [B.I's] raspy, melodic voice to shine through."

Time picked "BTBT" for its list of "The Best K-Pop Songs and Albums of 2022 So Far", calling it a "groovy track that seduces with its smooth melodies as much as it does with its inviting lyrics." Dazed ranked the song fifth on its list of "The best K-pop tracks of 2022",
while one of the pop culture writers invited by Teen Vogue to choose a song "that spoke to them and the world around them" concluded their glowing depiction of "BTBT" by stating that "if there's one K-pop song in 2022 that you shouldn't miss, it's this one."

Commercial performance
"BTBT" didn't enter South Korea's Circle Digital Chart upon release, but the global single proved to be a long-lasting commercial success nonetheless, with noticeably good digital sales and streams reported by music platforms worldwide, including for regions such as Africa, Europe or the United States. As another evidence of the single's wide reach, it was also one of the 25 most searched K-pop songs with the music recognition application Shazam in 2022, among chart-topping songs and songs by the most internationally famous K-pop acts.

Aitty Too's choreography was a major factor in "BTBT"'s success. The dance performance film had been watched more than 37 million times on YouTube in November 2022, exceeding 50 million in March 2023. Meanwhile, the hashtag #btbtchallenge, inviting users to cover the dance, had accumulated more than 130 million views on TikTok in November 2022.

Including "BTBT", Love or Loved Part.1'''s songs reached 100 millions total streams on the global music platform Spotify in February 2023. The album had also charted for five weeks on Circle Chart's album chart upon release, peaking at 11 on the second week. More than 30,000 physical copies were sold through retailers whose sales count towards South Korean charts.

Track listing
Credits are adapted from the album's liner notes (Card Pack version).  Less detailed credits are also available in the Korea Music Copyright Association's database.

Charts

Weekly charts

Monthly charts

Personnel
Credits are adapted from the album's liner notes.

Production
 B.I – executive producer
 Aaron Mattes – mixing ("Keep Me Up", "BTBT", "Middle With You")
 Tiernan Cranny – mastering ("Keep Me Up", "BTBT", "Middle With You")
 Sunwoo – mixing ("Tangerine", "Endless Summer") 
 Chris Gehringer – mastering ("Tangerine", "Endless Summer")

No one is officially credited for recording Love or Loved Part.1. Nevertheless, the documentary film That one cannot exist without the other'' includes some footage of B.I handling it himself.

Additional personnel

 Sim Hye-jin – production director
 Oh Su-min – A&R
 Kim Ha-neul – A&R
 Yang Jin-woo – A&R
 Hosua Yoh – global A&R
 Lee Won-sun – global A&R
 Nick.K – management
 Yeo In-seo – management
 Transparent Arts – global management
 Wonder – global management
 Cho Na-lim – music video director ("Keep Me Up"), performance film director ("BTBT"), contents studio
 Daniel Ho Jung – contents studio
 Ambience – music video post production, concept film production
 Hiijack – concept film director
 Lee Su-ho – music video director ("BTBT")
 Jangdukhwa – photography
 Kimheejune – photography
 Kim Jung-tae – design director
 Kim Hyun-ji – design director assistant
 Yu Seung-hwi – tattoo drawing
 Jung Fwan-wook – styling
 Jang Min-cheol – styling assistant
 Kim So-hee – hair
 Park So-yeon – hair assistant
 Noh Hang-yeol – make-up
 Lee Ye-eun – make-up assistant
 Lisa Jarvis – music video styling ("BTBT")
 Gregory Kara – music video styling customization ("BTBT")
 Keko Hainswheeler – music video styling customization ("BTBT")
 Yun Gwang-hyo – music video hair ("BTBT")
 Kim Youmin – music video hair assistant ("BTBT")
 Youngbeen – choreography ("BTBT", "Keep Me Up")
 Shawn – choreography ("BTBT", "Keep Me Up")
 Beom – choreography ("BTBT", "Keep Me Up")
 Jinwoo – choreography ("BTBT")
 Tarzan – choreography ("BTBT")
 Xin Seoul – promotion photography ("BTBT")
 Jung Se-woong – executive adviser

Release history

References 

Korean-language EPs
2022 EPs